Aloja Municipality is a former municipality in Latvia. The municipality was formed in 2009 by merging Aloja town with its countryside territory, Staicele town with its countryside territory, Braslava Parish and Brīvzemnieki Parish, the administrative centre being Aloja. In 2010 Aloja Parish was created from the countryside territory of Aloja town and Staicele Parish was created from the countryside territory of Staicele town.
 
On 1 July 2021, Aloja Municipality ceased to exist and its territory was merged into Limbaži Municipality.

Aloja Municipality was located in the territory of the North Vidzeme Biosphere Reserve, its rural territories border with the Republic of Estonia, Kocēni, Mazsalaca, Salacgrīva and Limbaži counties. It consisted of the town and parish of Aloja, the town and parish of Staicele, the parish of Braslava and the parish of Brīvzemnieki. There are two small towns in the territory of the county - Aloja and Staicele. In them it is possible to get acquainted with the historical buildings of the end of the 19th century and the beginning of the 20th century, especially the wooden architecture, the Liv cultural heritage of Salaca region.

Distance to the capital Riga - 130 km

See also 
 Administrative divisions of Latvia

References

External links 
 

 
Former municipalities of Latvia